Prison Ball is a 2004 American documentary film directed by Jason Moriarty and written by Jeff Scheftel. The 90-minute film is narrated by Ice-T.

Prison Ball is about prison basketball as practiced by prisoners within prison walls. The documentary interviews various inmates and prison officials and specialists on the matter and tackles as well "prison basketball leagues" operating within prison systems. It focuses on four Louisiana state prison teams, and was shot mainly in New Orleans, Louisiana, United States.

Awards and nominations 
In 2004, it was nominated for the Hollywood Film Festival awards for the category "Hollywood Documentary Award".

References

External links 
 

American sports documentary films
Documentary films about basketball
2004 films
Documentary films about incarceration in the United States
2004 documentary films
2000s English-language films
2000s American films